Bárbara Mori Ochoa (born 2 February 1978) is an Uruguayan-born Mexican actress, model, producer and writer. She is known for playing the main character in the 2004 telenovela Rubí, one of the most successful telenovelas of all time. Since 2005, she has appeared as the lead character in several Hollywood and Bollywood films such as My Brother's Wife (2005), Violanchelo (2008), Insignificant Things (2008) produced by Guillermo del Toro, Kites (2010), Cantinflas (2014) and Treintona, soltera y fantástica (2016).

Mori started her career in 1992 as a fashion model at the age of 14, later she became an actress when she co-starred in 1997 on the smash TV-hit Mirada de mujer with TV Azteca; then, she starred in the telenovela Azul Tequila (1998). She has also appeared in several lists as one of the most beautiful Mexican actresses of all time.

Life and career
Mori was born in Uruguay. Her paternal grandfather was Japanese. Her mother is of Lebanese descent. She has two siblings, actress Kenya Mori and Kintaró Mori. Her parents divorced when she was three years of age, Mori spent her early childhood between Mexico and Uruguay and finally settled in Mexico City at the age of twelve.

Early work (1992–1997)
One day, while working as a waitress at the age of fourteen, fashion designer Marcos Toledo invited her to work as a model. She became independent by the age of seventeen and went to live with her cousins. At nineteen she met actor Sergio Mayer, who would later become father to their son Sergio, born in 1998. They never married.

She later studied acting in El Centro de Estudios de Formación Actoral. She made her acting debut in the Mexican telenovela Al norte del corazón. She then participated in the comedy series Tric Tac and Mirada de mujer the following year. She obtained her first TVyNovelas Award for her role in Mirada de mujer for Best New Actress.

Commercial success (1998–2003)
In 1998, Mori got her first leading role as "Azul" in the series Azul Tequila, co-starring with Mauricio Ochmann. A year later, she filmed the series Me muero por tí in Miami, with Peruvian actor Christian Meier.  Later, she acted in various other telenovelas, including the Telemundo telenovela Amor descarado.

In 2001, she got her first film role in the romantic comedy Inspiración, the film was a box-office success in cinemas. In 2002, she's playing the villainess role as a seductive college student in the telenovela, Subete A Mi Moto.

Consolidation (2004–2008)

In 2004, she signs with Televisa and starred as Rubí, a smash TV-hit and highly–rated Mexican soap opera, of the same name, which earned her another TVyNovelas Award.

In 2005, she obtained the starring role in the blockbuster film La mujer de mi hermano as Zoe, and her husband was portrayed by Christian Meier, with whom she had previously co-starred in Me muero por tí. At the same year, she lent her voice in the Spanish-language version for the movie Robots.

She also had the leading role in "Pretendiendo", a Chilean/Mexican-backed movie which was critically panned.

International film success (2009–2011)
In 2009, she starred in the psychological crime thriller Amor, Dolor y Viceversa alongside Leonardo Sbaraglia, the drama is about a female architect who is involved in the murder of the fiancée of a promising surgeon, who allegedly saw in her nightmares. The crime-drama was filmed in Mexico City and is produced by Mori. The film earned mixed reviews from critics and viewers.

In 2011, she got the main role in the action-drama "Viento En Contra", alongside actors Héctor Arredondo and Fernando Luján, in which she played a successful and promising CIO, who is unjustly involved in a police chase due to a scandal of a financial fraud. The film was distributed by Warner Bros and received mixed reviews by critics. The drama was filmed on locations of Mexico City and Valle de Bravo. Mori was the producer of the film.

Indian film producer Rakesh Roshan signed her as the leading lady for his movie Kites opposite his son, Bollywood star Hrithik Roshan. It was shot in New Mexico, Las Vegas and Los Angeles, it went into production by the end of July 2008, and was released on 21 May 2010.

Mori was diagnosed with early stage cancer and is now a proud survivor. She talks about her journey in UniGlobe Entertainment's docu-drama titled 1 a Minute made by actress Namrata Singh Gujral.

Personal life

In 1996, Mori began a relationship with actor Sergio Mayer, with whom she has a son, Sergio Mayer Mori, born in 1998. The couple separated shortly after. In 2016 she wed baseball player Kenneth Ray Sigman, brother of actress Stephanie Sigman. The couple divorced in 2017.

Mori's son had a daughter, Mila, in November 2016, making her a grandmother at 38.

Filmography

Awards and nominations

Ariel Awards

Premios TVyNovelas

Premios Juventud

Premios People en Español

Premios Canacine

References

External links

Biography in Spanish at esmas.com

1978 births
Living people
Mexican telenovela actresses
Mexican television actresses
Mexican film actresses
Mexican stage actresses
Mexican voice actresses
Mexican female models
Mexican television producers
Women television producers
Mexican women writers
Mexican screenwriters
20th-century Mexican actresses
21st-century Mexican actresses
Actresses from Mexico City
Actresses from Montevideo
Mexican people of Japanese descent
Mexican people of Uruguayan descent
Uruguayan people of Japanese descent
Mexican people of Lebanese descent
Mexican people of Basque descent
People educated at Centro de Estudios y Formación Actoral
Naturalized citizens of Mexico
Uruguayan emigrants to Mexico
Actresses of Japanese descent
People from Montevideo
Mexican women screenwriters